Frongoch is a village near Bala, in Gwynedd (formerly Merionethshire), Wales. 

Frongoch may also refer to:
Frongoch internment camp, a prisoner of war camp near Frongoch village during the First World War
Frongoch railway station, a railway station serving Frongoch village

Mining
Frongoch quarry, Aberdyfi, a slate quarry near Aberdyfi in Gwynedd, Wales
Frongoch quarry, Bala, a slate quarry near Frongoch village; see Slate industry in Wales
Frongoch mine, Ceredigion, a lead and zinc mine near Pont-rhyd-y-groes in Ceredigion (formerly Cardiganshire), Wales